Lucy Baker (1836 – 30 May 1909) was the first female teacher and missionary in present-day Prince Albert, Saskatchewan. She pioneered the development of the western Canadian settlement.

Life and career 
Baker was born in Summertown, Glengarry County, Ontario, and raised from a young age by her aunt. She became a teacher shortly after finishing school in Fort Covington, New York.

Her teaching career was as varied as it was wide-ranging. She first worked in Dundee, then held classes in New Jersey for a women's school. She moved to New Orleans not long afterwards to co-own another women's school just before the American Civil War. In 1878, she returned to Glengarry County to teach a private school.

In 1879, minister Donald Ross asked Baker to teach at a missionary school in Prince Albert, on behalf of the Presbyterian church. She accepted the offer, and trekked cross-country to arrive at the western territory in 1879. She earned a permanent teaching grant at the mission school in 1880. 

In 1890, Baker relocated to the Makoce Washte reserves in present-day South Dakota, where she served as chief instructor at a school for Sioux refugees. She learned to speak Sioux, and regularly spoke Mass (Christianity) in the refugee's native language. She remained teaching at Makoce Washte until her retirement in 1905.

References 

1836 births
1909 deaths
People from the United Counties of Stormont, Dundas and Glengarry
Canadian Presbyterian missionaries
Presbyterian missionaries in Canada
Canadian educators
Pre-Confederation Saskatchewan people
Female Christian missionaries
Missionary educators